Barrio Libre is a neighborhood in Tucson, Arizona notable for its existence as a relatively unchanged 19th-century Hispanic neighborhood of close-packed row houses. Houses in the barrio are typically adobe with very plain detailing, reflecting the area's history as a district of townhouses for Mexican ranching families. The district includes more than 200 contributing structures, with relatively few non-conforming buildings. The district is bounded by 14th and 18th streets to the north and south, and by Stone and Osborne to the east and west. Meyer Avenue runs through the center of the barrio.

The district was listed on the National Register of Historic Places on October 18, 1978.

References

External links
 Barrio Libre at the National Park Service
 Tucson's Barrio Libre online chapter from Barrio Historico Tucson, University of Arizona

 Neighborhoods in Tucson, Arizona
 Historic districts on the National Register of Historic Places in Arizona
 National Register of Historic Places in Tucson, Arizona
 Buildings and structures completed in 1885
 Historic American Buildings Survey in Arizona